Cleopatra: Original Soundtrack Album is the soundtrack from the film of the same name, released by 20th Century Fox Records in 1963. The music of Cleopatra was composed and conducted by Alex North, and was recorded and produced in 1963. 

It has been released several times, first as an original vinyl album, in 1963. Later, in 1997, it was released in CD format by Tsunami Records, in Germany, as a Limited Edition album. The most popular of the releases was the Deluxe Edition, or 2001 Varèse Sarabande Edition, released as a double CD in 2001.

Joseph L. Mankiewicz, the film's director, made the unusual gesture, for him, of contributing extensive liner notes for the 1963 Original Soundtrack Album. These notes provide a valuable elucidation of many points in Mankiewicz's conception of Cleopatra that are unrealized in the version of the film that was released. Ironically, it was Mankiewicz's son Christopher who recommended North after his enthusiasm for his great score for Spartacus (1960).

In 1964, Cleopatra: Original Soundtrack Album was nominated for the Academy Award for Best Music Score - Substantially Original, and for the Grammy Award for Best Background Score from a Motion Picture or Television, but on both occasions it lost to Tom Jones (1963).

Releases
The soundtrack of Cleopatra was released on Compact Disc in two different versions at two different times. The original vinyl selection of tracks had long gone out of print before digital restorations of the soundtrack was released. The versions are as follows:

 The 1997 limited edition, released by Tsunami Records, an independent German record label, called Cleopatra: The Complete Original Motion Picture Soundtrack, contained selected tracks, not representing the complete range of tracks heard in the film. The Tsunami release is also considered to be of an inferior sound quality and was made redundant by the complete Varèse Sarabande release.
 The 2001 Varèse Sarabande album, named Cleopatra: Original Motion Picture Soundtrack, is by far the most popular release of the soundtrack of Cleopatra. Running over 151 minutes, the album contains the entire score heard in the film in chronological order. It was released over two discs.

Track listing

Nomination and ratings

Cleopatra: Original Soundtrack Album was nominated for the Academy Award for Best Music Score - Substantially Original at the 1964 ceremony, and for the Grammy Award for Best Sound Track Album – Background Score from a Motion Picture or Television at its 1964 ceremony, but on both occasions it lost to Tom Jones (1963), with music composed by John Addison. 

On the site Filmtracks.com, the soundtrack is rated 5/5. Allmusic rates the soundtrack 5/5.

See also
 Cleopatra (1963 film)
 Impressions of Cleopatra

References

1963 soundtrack albums
Varèse Sarabande soundtracks
Alex North soundtracks
Albums produced by Alex North
Drama film soundtracks